András Kepes (born October 11, 1948) is a Hungarian author, television host, documentary filmmaker and academic. He is Professor of film and media and Chair of the Council of Arts of the Budapest Metropolitan University (METU).

Life
András Kepes was born in Budapest, Hungary, and grew up in his native city, as well as in Beirut and Buenos Aires, where his father, Imre Kepes was stationed as a diplomat. He lives in Budapest with his wife, Mária Dettai. He has six children: Júlia (b. 1974), Borbála (b. 1975), Rozália (b. 1990), Kata (b. 1998), Lujza (b. 2005), Lukács (b. 2011).

Education
Educated in Hungary, Lebanon, Argentina and the U.S. he earned and MA in literature and aesthetics from Eötvös Loránd University (ELTE), Doctor of Liberal Arts (equivalent of PhD.) and Dr. habil. of film and video from the University of Theatre and Film Arts, Budapest. He was a John S. Knight Fellow Fellow at Stanford University and a Fulbright Scholar at New York University (NYU).

Career

As a senior producer and host of the most popular Hungarian TV channels Kepes has produced cultural programs and documentaries in Hungary as well as in more than 40 countries around the world. In them, he has covered a wild range of topics including the most important International film festivals, the Nobel Prize ceremonies, the life of native people in the Andes, in the Canadian Rockies, in the rainforest of the Amazons and in the deserts of Asia, the coexistence of cultural minorities in Africa, the Chinese culture after the cataclysmic political changes, modernism and traditions in Kuwait and Japan, the Tibetan culture in the Himalayas, Yugoslavia during the war, American cinema and Latin-American literature. To mention but a few guest actors and directors of his shows: Woody Allen, Lindsey Anderson, Peter Brook, Glenn Close, Federico Fellini, Elia Kazan, Gina Lollobrigida, Marcello Mastroianni, Jean Marais, Yves Montand, Fernando Rey, Martin Scorsese, Donald Sutherland, Billy Wilder;  musicians:  Dave Brubeck, Donovan, Steve Reich; writers: Alejo Carpentier, Julio Cortázar,  Gabriel García Márquez, Octavio Paz,  Juan Rulfo, Mario Vargas Llosa; visual artists: André Kertész, Antoni Tapies, Alexandre Trauner,  and even the Dalai Lama. As a visiting lecturer and later as a professor in film and media studies he has taught at various universities. From 2008 he is Professor of film and media at the Budapest Metropolitan University. Between 2010-2014 he was Dean of the Faculty of Communication and Arts of this university. Since 2008 the main focus of his career has been writing.

Books

 Tövispuszta (Thorn-desert) novel, revised edition, Libri, 2017
 Világkép (Worldview), literary essay, Libri, Budapest, 2016, revised edition 2017
 The Inflatable Buddha, novel, Armadillo Central, London, 2013
 Tövispuszta (Thorn-desert), novel, Ulpius-ház, Budapest, 2011
 Maendene Sat Skakmat, documentary novel, Informations Forlag, Kobenhaven, 2010
 Matt a férfiaknak (Checkmate to Men), documentary novel, Alexandra, 2008
 Könyv-jelző (Bookmark), selection of 20th century World Literature, Park, 2002
 Könyv-jelző (Bookmark), selection of Contemporary Hungarian Writers, Park, 2002
 Könyv-jelző (Bookmark), selection of Classical Hungarian Writers, Park, 2001
 Kepes Krónika - történetek, (Stories), Park, 2000
 Kepes Krónika - beszélgetések (Interviews), Park, 1999
 Szerencsés útjaim (My Nice Trips), reports, Múzsák, 1986

Board and committee memberships 
 2010-12 Member of the Art Board of the Hungarian Accreditation Committee
 2004-06 Member of the Art and Communication Board of the Hungarian Accreditation Committee
 1999-   Curator of the Joseph Pulitzer Memorial Prize Board
 1995-97 Delegate of Hungary at the International Program for Development of Communication (IPDC) of UNESCO, Paris
 1993-94 Curator of the Táncsics Prize Board
 1990-94 Member of the Presidency of the Association of Hungarian Film and Television Artists
 1990-94 Chairman of the Organization of Hungarian Television Journalists

Awards
 2017 Arany Könyv − nominee (for Világkép)
 2017 Libri Literary Reader's Award − for Világkép
 2011 Prima Award
 2011 Arany Könyv (Golden Book) nominee (for his novel: Tövispuszta)
 2005 Déri János Prize
 1998 Officer's Cross of the Order of Merit of the Hungarian Republic
 1997 Tolerance Award
 1996 Opus Award
 1995 Magyar Lajos Prize
 1995 Press Box Award: Best Reporter
 1994 Pulitzer Memorial Prize
 1991 Táncsics Prize

References

External links

 András Kepes' Official Website
 
 Budapesti Kommunikációs Főiskola Budapest Metropolitan University
 András Kepes' Official Website
 MTI ki kicsoda 2009. Szerk. Hermann Péter. Budapest: Magyar Távirati Iroda. 2008. 
 Aranykönyv: Ismeretterjesztő 
 Libri Csoport / Libri Kiadó / Szerzők / Kepes András

Living people
Hungarian journalists
Hungarian television personalities
1948 births
Officer's Crosses of the Order of Merit of the Republic of Hungary (civil)